The FM Towns Marty is a fifth-generation home video game console released in 1993 by Fujitsu, exclusively for the Japanese market. It is often claimed to be the first 32-bit CD-based home video game system, although it has a 16-bit data bus, just like the earlier Commodore CDTV and Sega CD, which both have Motorola 68000 processors that are similar internally 16/32-bit, but with a 16-bit data bus. The console came complete with a built in CD-ROM drive and disk drive. It was based on the earlier FM Towns computer system Fujitsu had released in 1989. The Marty was backward-compatible with older FM Towns games.

It featured a darker gray shell and a new lower price (¥66,000 or  but was otherwise identical to the first Marty. It is widely believed that the FM Towns Marty 2 would feature similar improvements to the FM Towns 2, which had a swifter CPU than the first, but this was not the case. It has also been speculated that the Marty 2 featured an Intel 486 CPU; however, this was also discovered to be false.

It included a built in navigation system with audio and video guidance, and could also be detached from the car and played at home. An optional IC Card for the FM Towns Car Marty allowed it to use VICS, and was subsequently sold with a video monitor.

Technical specifications
CPU AMD 386SX processor (32-bit)  (3.6 MIPS)
RAM
 Main RAM: 2 MB (2048 KB)
 Video RAM: 640 KB (512 KB VRAM, 128 KB sprite RAM)
Graphics
 GPU: Fujitsu custom graphics chip
 Display resolution: 256×240, 256×256, 320×240, 352×232, 360×240, 512×480, 640×200, 640×480, 720×480
 Bitmap background planes: 1 (with sprite plane) or 2 (without sprite plane)
 Virtual resolution: 256×512, 512×256, 512×512, 640×819, 1024×512
 Color palette: 4096, or 32,768, or 16,777,216
 Colors on screen: 16, or 256, or 32,768
 Sprite foreground plane: 256×240 to 640×480 resolution, 256 colors on screen, out of 32,768 color palette
 Hardware integer zooming: 1/2× vertical, 1/2/3/4/5× horizontalThe Marty had only composite and S-Video output; no other video connectors are possible. As some FM Towns games were VGA-only, the Marty had a  down-scan capability for displaying on a household TV screen.
 Sprites Up to 1024 sprites, 16×16 pixels sprite size, 16 colors per sprite
Sound
 Yamaha YM2612: 6 channel FM synthesis
 Ricoh RF5c68: 8 channel PCM sampling, 10-bit audio, 19.6 kHz sample rate
 CD-DA: 1 channel PCM playback, 16-bit audio, 44.1 kHz sampling rate
 Data storage
 CD-ROM, single-speed (1x)
 Internal 3.5" HD floppy driveFloppy disks must be formatted 1232 KiB (PC98-style). This can be done from the BIOS GUI. The Marty's disk drive does not support 1440 KiB or 720 KiB FAT-formatted 3.5" floppy disks. For a PC to be compatible with FM Towns Marty floppies it must have a disk drive, BIOS and OS that supports   There are also USB floppy drives that support 
 Multi-purpose 

The Marty's IC Card slot is compatible with type 1 PCMCIA cards, including battery-backed SRAM cards (accessible from the BIOS menu) that can be mapped to a drive letter and used as a small drive. Fujitsu also officially released a PCMCIA  modem (FMM-CM301) for the FM Towns Marty. This modem was bundled with the special TCMarty that also came with a printer port.  While it is widely believed that the IC Card slot can be used for RAM expansions, this is not correct. 

Controllers
 4-way D-pad, A and B buttons, Select, and Run, as well as an extra button above the two "face" buttons
 2 standard controller portsThe controller connector is a DE-9, referred to as an "Atari Type" in Japan because it is fundamentally the same connector as an Atari 2600. The Marty's Run and Select buttons are the equivalent of pressing right and left, or up and down at the same time.  A six-button controller from Fujitsu was available for use with Capcom's Street Fighter II. Capcom also released an adapter for their CPS Fighter stick which made the stick compatible with the FM Towns/Marty as well as the Sharp X68000.
 Keyboard port

Games

Reception

Despite having excellent hardware from a gameplay perspective, both the FM Towns and the FM Towns Marty were very poor sellers in Japan. They were expensive and the custom hardware meant expandability was not as easy as with DOS/V (IBM PC clones with Japanese DOS or Microsoft Windows) systems. NEC's PC98 series computers were also dominant in Japan when the FM Towns Marty was released, making it difficult to break out before the DOS/V invasion took control of the market. This was despite such revolutionary features as bootable CD-ROMs and a color GUI OS on the FM Towns PC, something that predated Microsoft's Windows 95b bootable CD by seven years. Software today is rare and expensive due to the low production runs. Despite backwards compatibility with most older FM Towns PC games, compatibility issues plagued the Marty as newer titles were released with the FM Towns in mind, further limiting its potential as a true "console version" of the FM Towns PC. The Marty did have its own library of "Marty" specific games, but they were not enough to strengthen its niche position between video game console systems and personal computers.

When Fujitsu lowered the price and released the Marty 2 sales started to increase, but the corporate attitude was that it was a lost cause, and so the system was dropped.

Notes

References

External links
 tripod.com/~faberp/: General information and pictures
 consoledatabase.com: Console Database entry
 nfggames.com: FM Towns Marty Disassembly
 gamesx.com: FM Towns Controller Connector
 xe-emulator.com: Xe, an emulator collection - domain appears to be squatted
 gamescollection.it: Fm Towns Marty games database

1990s toys
CD-ROM-based consoles
Home video game consoles
Fifth-generation video game consoles
Marty
Japan-only video game hardware
Products introduced in 1993
X86-based game consoles